The Starter Wife may refer to:

The Starter Wife, a 2006 novel by Gigi Levangie Grazer
 The Starter Wife (miniseries), a 2007 television miniseries based on the novel
 The Starter Wife (TV series), a television series, a sequel to the miniseries of the same name

See also
Starter marriage